Robert W. Donnelly (March 22, 1931 – July 21, 2014) was an American Bishop of the Catholic Church. He served as an auxiliary bishop of the Diocese of Toledo from 1984 to 2006.

Biography
Born in Toledo, Ohio, Robert William Donnelly was ordained a priest for the Diocese of Toledo on May 25, 1957.  On March 14, 1984, Pope John Paul II appointed him as the Titular Bishop of Garba and Auxiliary Bishop of Toledo. He was consecrated by Bishop James Robert Hoffman on May 3, 1984. The principal co-consecrators were Archbishop Daniel Pilarczyk of Cincinnati and Bishop Emeritus John Donovan of Toledo. He continued to serve as an auxiliary bishop until his resignation was accepted by Pope Benedict XVI on May 30, 2006.

References

1931 births
2014 deaths
People from Toledo, Ohio
Roman Catholic Diocese of Toledo
20th-century American Roman Catholic titular bishops
21st-century American Roman Catholic titular bishops
Catholics from Ohio